These lists of synapsids collectively include every genus that has ever been included in the clade Synapsida- the mammals and their evolutionary precursors. The lists includes accepted genera along with those now considered invalid, doubtful (nomina dubia), not formally published (nomina nuda), junior synonyms of more established names, as well as genera that are no longer considered synapsids.

Lists
 List of pelycosaurs
 List of therapsids
 List of prehistoric mammals
 List of mammals

See also
 List of reptiles
 List of birds

External links
 Main Groups of Non-Mammalian Synapsida

Synapsids